Zhao Chunsheng (born 6 January 1977) is a Chinese fencer. He competed in the team épée and individual sabre events at the 2000 Summer Olympics.

References

External links
 

1977 births
Living people
Chinese male fencers
Olympic fencers of China
Fencers at the 2000 Summer Olympics
Asian Games medalists in fencing
Fencers at the 2002 Asian Games
Asian Games silver medalists for China
Medalists at the 2002 Asian Games